Geneviève Morel (1916–1989) was a French stage and film actress.

Selected filmography

 Beating Heart (1940)
 Mademoiselle Swing (1942)
 Goodbye Leonard (1943)
 Secrets of a Ballerina (1943)
 Cecile Is Dead (1944)
 Dropped from Heaven (1946)
 The Captain (1946)
 The Misfortunes of Sophie (1946)
 Monsieur Vincent (1947)
 Dreams of Love (1947)
 Les Amants du pont Saint-Jean (1947)
 Monelle (1948)
 Manon 1949)
 White Paws (1949)
 Night Round (1949)
 Two Loves (1949)
 Fantomas Against Fantomas (1949)
 The Barton Mystery (1949)
 Bed for Two; Rendezvous with Luck (1950)
 Miquette (1950)
 A Love Under an Umbrella (1950)
 Tuesday's Guest (1950)
 Thirst of Men (1950)
 Le roi des camelots (1951)
 Paris Still Sings (1951)
 The Strange Madame X (1951)
 Two Pennies Worth of Violets (1951)
 Without Leaving an Address (1951)
 The Red Rose (1951)
 Holiday for Henrietta (1952)
 She and Me (1952)
 Crimson Curtain (1952)
 Wonderful Mentality (1953)
 The Three Musketeers (1953)
 Their Last Night (1953)
 Monte Carlo Baby (1953)
 Open Letter (1953)
 Les révoltés de Lomanach (1954)
 Les hommes ne pensent qu'à ça (1954)
 Les Duraton (1954)
 Marguerite de la nuit (1955)
 La Bande à papa (1956)
 Maxime (1958)

References

Bibliography
 Ayfre, Amédée. The Films of Robert Bresson. Praeger, 1970.
 Bessy, Maurice & Chirat, Raymond. ''Histoire du cinéma français: encyclopédie des films, 1940–1950. Pygmalion, 1986

External links

1916 births
1989 deaths
French stage actresses
French film actresses
People from Les Andelys
20th-century French women